Southend High School for Boys, also known by its initialism SHSB, is a selective secondary Grammar school situated along Prittlewell Chase in Prittlewell, in the north-west of Southend-on-Sea, England, south-west of the roundabout of the A127 and A1159. It teaches students from the age of 11 through to 18 years old, and admission to the school is dependent upon their performance in selective 11+ tests set by the Consortium of Selective Schools in Essex (CSSE). It converted to Academy status on 1 February 2011, and has autonomous control over itself. Student numbers have been increasing over recent years. As of academic year 2008–2009, there are just over 1,150 students on roll, with over 230 of them in the Sixth Form, 20 to 30 of which come from other schools, including girls.

The school consistently achieves over 95% of its students attaining 5 GCSEs grade A*–C each year, and was one of the few schools in the country to achieve "outstanding" in the latest Ofsted inspection.

The current Headteacher is Dr Robin Bevan, who has a doctorate in education and was appointed in September 2007, and the previous headmaster was Michael D Frampton, a History teacher who served as Headmaster from 1988 to 2007. The current deputy heads are Mrs E Smith and Mrs R Worth and the assistant head is Mrs C Bates.

Former pupils, teachers, and other members of the school are known as Old Southendians, and are entitled to join the Old Southendian Association (OSA) of past members and alumni, to keep in touch and network with other former pupils at social, sporting, and musical events, and on trips and meals. The OSA has the motto "sustaining friendships", and is one of the oldest and largest Boys Associations in the country, with 2,470 members as of October 2011. The school also has a Parents' Association (PA), which is a registered charity, and associated PA Committee.

History
The school was founded in 1895 on a site in Victoria Circus, and provided the first secondary education within the Borough of Southend-on-Sea. It moved to its present larger site, along Prittlewell Chase, in 1939. In 1940 the school was evacuated to Mansfield in Nottinghamshire but the boys returned before the end of the war. Until 1974 it was administered by the County Borough of Southend-on-Sea Education Committee, then Essex County Council, and then the Unitary Authority of Southend-on-Sea from 1998.

Specialism and awards
In 2001 the school was a Language College as part of the Specialist Schools and Academies Trust, promoting modern foreign languages both inside and outside the curriculum as well as within the local community. It was a founder member of Southend Excellence Cluster, supporting and collaborating with nearly thirty primary and secondary schools. In 2006, as a high-performing specialist school, it was invited to become a Leading Edge school, promoting innovation in teaching and learning in liaison with local partner schools. Despite now converting to academy status in 2011, the school still promotes languages as a specialism

The school has also received the National Association for Able Children in Education (NACE) Challenge Award "for Excellence in Provision for Able, Gifted & Talented Pupils", the Leading Aspect Award, and the Department for Education and Skills Sportsmark award.

Award System
Students may earn a form of award called Colours for significant achievement in academics, sport, debating or music and drama.  Commonly these are awarded to winners of National or County tournaments however they are also awarded for extraordinary service to the school.  They are also awarded for prestigious efforts undertaken by students outside of their school careers.  There are four forms of colours raising in prestige: Term colours, for students performing an act of real merit; Year Colours, for students performing meritorious acts over an academic year; Half school colours, for dedication, achievement and service to a field and Full School Colours which are awarded very rarely to remarkable acts carried out on behalf of the school across a student's school career.

Colours are indicated by a range of additions to a students blazers: term and year colours are indistinguishable and take the form of a small brass badge with coloured enamel affixed to the lapel.  The badge is coloured to indicate the school year in which it was earned and the field it was earned in is embossed in brass on it.  Half school colours take the form of a badge sewn onto the breast of the blazer above the school crest on the pocket.  The badge is always school green and the text gold.  Full School colours are gold band sewn in rings onto the arms of the blazer one ring per award.

Building extensions & premises upgrades
Although the building was originally built almost symmetrically in 1939, it has undergone various changes which have meant that this is no longer the case.

In 1992, QE1 and QE2 classrooms were built inside the East End quadrangle to cope with the demand arising from extra pupils.

In 1995, the Hitchcock Library was constructed to fill in the West End quadrangle with a new art room, W17 on top. The library was needed to alleviate overcrowding in the "Old Library" which is located above the headmaster's office & main school office.

In 1998, the Sixth Form centre was built, removing four of the "temporary huts" 37 years after they were built.

In 2003, the Language College was constructed to create room for an expanded intake of pupils; an extra 25 per year starting in the 2002–2003 year. As this was built, subject rooms also got swapped around; Mathematics moved from the four other huts into E1, E2, E3 and QE1 (E1 and E9 were previously German rooms, E2, QE1, and QE2 were French rooms, and E3 was a Latin room). E9 became an extra English Room (previously English had just E5, E6, E7 and E8) and Religious Education gained the use of QE2. Music also gained the use of L6 in the Language College for a short period of time whilst the Sports Hall & Music Centre was under construction. In the Language College, German was moved into L1 and L2, Spanish into L6 and L9, French into L10, L11, L12, L14, L15 and L16. L4, L7, and L8 are small rooms used for speaking practice and L3 and L13 are computer suites.

Owing to such a long time in sub-standard accommodation in Music and Physical Education (as mentioned by the OFSTED report of 2001), a bid was made to Southend Borough Council for a grant to be awarded for a new Sports Hall and Music Centre (following the construction of a top quality facility at St Bernard's High School for Girls). Permission was granted and the sum of £2.25 million was given to the school for the construction of this new facility. The school began a development appeal to raise a further £475,000 in order to equip the centre with the latest fitness machines and recording studio. This was the largest amount an English High School had hoped to raise in the history of British education. The appeal lasted for 3 years until 2006 when it was closed. The total raised was £376,000; slightly less than expected. Unlike the Sixth Form Centre and Language College, which were built from prefabricated units in a brick shell, this building was designed by Peter Emptage & Associates and built to last. According to documentation, this building is constructed to last 120 years. Constructed in a steel frame and finished in glass, red brick, micro fibbed aluminium panelling and a beech coloured wood, the new centre boasts a 5 badminton court size sports hall, the largest school sports hall in Southend Borough (the only larger indoor hall is that at Southend Leisure & Tennis Centre). This building was completed in September 2005 and is now well used; not only by members of the school community but also the wider community in the evenings and at weekends.

In November 2008 two temporary classrooms were installed to the east of the main buildings between the music centre and the rear exit. These buildings have been constructed to relieve the inevitable stress of the new, larger pupil intake and also to provide alternative classrooms for the rooms disrupted by the planned complete window changes in the main building. The planning application was granted subject to the condition that the rooms are removed once the extension to the Sports Hall is completed.

In May 2009, a planning application was submitted to Southend Council to extend the Sports Hall & Music Centre on its western side, effectively infilling the underused grass area. The application included 6 classrooms over two phases; four in Phase 1 and 2 IT suites in Phase 2, located to the north of Phase 1. The four classrooms will be used to house the Mathematics department and include 111 square metres of circulation space as well as ample storage and an office. A connection will be created from the fitness suite to the upstairs of the new extension, but will only come into use during emergency evacuations or disabled people using the lift in the main Sports Hall. Construction has begun in February 2010 with scheduled completion for Phase 1 in June 2010.

Over the summer months of 2010, T3 was converted to a food technology room due to the government's requirements for all schools to teach food technology as part of the curriculum beginning year 2010/11.

In December 2009, a planning application was submitted to Southend Council to extend the Dining Hall into the eating area with a 150 square metre room, linked to both the dining hall and main hall. This allows the room to be used both for the lunchtime seating expansion of the dining hall, exam desk expansion during exam season, and for light refreshments during school events such as the annual drama performance or music concerts.

In 2022, building works were completed on a new classroom on the second floor of the East End. The new classroom is intended for Special Educational Needs (SEN) pupils. A new catering facility and refurbishments to QE1 and QE2 were also completed.

Traditions

House system 
Students at Southend High School for Boys are split into four houses; Athens (motto: nulli secundus – 'second to none'), Tuscany (motto: sine labore nihil – 'nothing without effort'), Sparta (motto: non sibi sed domo – 'Not for self, for house'), and Troy (motto: fortiter et recte – 'boldly and rightly'), modelled upon a traditional house system. Competitiveness is actively encouraged between houses as the students contend to win the Cock House Championship. Students compete in sports, music, debating and other fields to secure house points to establish the victor.  In addition students earn house credits which are converted into house points which contribute towards the overall cup.  As well as the overall cup each event holds its individual trophy as well as cups for individuals.

School Song
During the school's early history, the school song was Forty Years On (a song adopted by several schools at the time). Around 1923, Lionel Elvin (a student and School Captain at the time) was invited to write an original song for the school after a conversation with his history master. Elvin wrote five verses which summarised school life and the nostalgic sentiment of its pupils. The song was presented to the Headmaster who approved. Although Elvin imagined the lyrics could be sung to the tune of The Lass that Loves a Sailor by Charles Dibdin, the school's music master wrote an original tune for Elvin's lyrics.

Sometime before the second world war two of Elvin's five verses were dropped. Around 1939 another music master, Arthur Hutchings, composed a new tune for the song which has been used ever since. Hutchings wrote the new melody as a piano accompaniment in pencil at the back of his hymn book. In 1953 construction of a new organ was completed and music master Reginald Foxwell adapted the tune for organ. When Foxwell died suddenly in 1957 A-level music students Gerald Usher and Paul Green inherited the responsibility of leading the school song for a year until a new music master was appointed. The two students found that no copy of the song existed and Hutchings' hymn book notes had been lost. Usher played the accompaniment as he remembered it and Green taught the younger students the lyrics. Although the lyrics were written down, when the two students left a year later the melody had still not been written down and only survived through memory and through passing it down from one generation to the next.

Thirty five years later in 1993 Usher was invited by Headmaster Michael Frampton to teach A-level music. Usher was shocked to find that the song was rarely sung and had changed somewhat due to it being passed on through oral tradition. Usher wrote down the 1957 version of the song from memory and made numerous copies. A few years later a copy of Hutchings' melody resurfaced in an old school newsletter from the 1940s and Usher was delighted to find that he had only mis-remembered one note and a slightly spread chord. During his time as a teacher, Usher encouraged the singing of the school song at numerous school events and nurtured its popularity among students.

The School Song has since been printed and published in several documents. The song is sung at several events every academic year, most notably at the end of the final assembly of each school term, during which the entire school (except the new students whom this is intended to startle) shouts the last word (“memory”) at the top of their voice. It is also sung by members of the Old Southendian Association at meet ups and is often sung by sixth form students repeatedly during their last day. The school song is used as the music on hold when calling the school's reception.

Academic performance 
The school was last inspected in February 2006 when the main conclusion of Ofsted (the Office for Standards in Education) was as follows:

"Southend High School for Boys is an outstanding school with a very strong ethos and a distinctive character. Its pupils are justifiably proud to belong to it, make very good progress and achieve exceptionally high standards. The school successfully balances an emphasis on academic achievement with a concern for pupils' personal development and well-being. This ensures that pupils are well prepared for their place in society.
They have also recently received the NACE Challenge Award, which means they are the first secondary school in the Eastern Counties to obtain it, and the 22nd school in the entire country of Britain to achieve the award."

Notable Old Southendians

Media
Mathew Baynton, actor
David Austin (cartoonist) (1935–2005), cartoonist for Private Eye
David Witts, actor & model
Phil Gardner, journalist
Brian Gibson, film director

Literature
Jonathan Clements, born 1971, author
Robert Nye, 1939–2016, poet and novelist

Music
Chris Copping and Robin Trower of Procol Harum
 Sam Duckworth, lead singer of Get Cape. Wear Cape. Fly
Digby Fairweather
Arthur Hutchings, musicologist, taught at the school, 1938–41
Adrian Lucas, conductor and organist
Vivian Stanshall, poet, author and singer-songwriter
 Bernard Stevens, composer

Armed Forces
Air Marshal Sir Frank Holroyd CB, Chief Engineer from 1988 to 1991 of the RAF
Brigadier Martin Hotine CMG CBE, commanded the Royal Engineers from 1917 to 1918, responsible for the design of the UK's triangulation pillars and for the Retriangulation of Great Britain in the 1930s
Air Marshal Sir William Richardson, Chief Engineer from 1986 to 1988 of the RAF, Station Commander from 1971 to 1974 of RAF Colerne

Science
Henry Chilver, Baron Chilver of Cranfield, engineer, Vice-Chancellor from 1970 to 1989 of Cranfield Institute of Technology (since 1993 Cranfield University)
Bertram Kelly, electrical engineer
Neil F. Johnson, professor of physics
 Yadvinder Malhi, Professor of Ecosystem Science at the University of Oxford

Academia
Professor Stanley Alexander de Smith, Downing Professor of the Laws of England from 1970 to 1974 at the University of Cambridge
Stephen Pewsey, historian
Professor Warwick Rodwell OBE, architectural historian and archaeologist
Samuel Soal, parapsychologist
Professor Roger Luckhurst, writer and academic

Government
Clive Needle, Labour MEP from 1994 to 1999 for Norfolk

Education
Professor Lionel Elvin, UNESCO Director of Education

Religion
Gareth Bennett, ecclesiastical historian.
Bertram Kelly: An engineer who brought light to the Isle of Man and later became a vicar.

Sport
Mark Foster, swimmer
Morgan Fox, footballer
Josh Rees, footballer
John Lloyd, Tennis Player,
Garry Nelson, footballer, author
Emile Acquah, footballer 
Noah Chilvers, footballer

References

External links 
 
EduBase

Educational institutions established in 1895
Grammar schools in Southend-on-Sea
Boys' schools in Essex
Academies in Southend-on-Sea
1895 establishments in England